The first season of Drag Race España premiered on 30 May and concluded on 25 July 2021. The competition was broadcast on ATRESplayer Premium in Spain and on WOW Presents Plus internationally. The competition saw ten Spanish drag queens compete for the title of the "Spain's First Drag Superstar", and a cash prize of €30,000.

The cast was officially revealed through social media on 5 May 2021. The winner of the first season was Carmen Farala, with Killer Queen and Sagittaria ending as runners-up. On 1 August 2021, an extra episode aired, where the three finalists watch the grand finale for the first time and react to finding out the winner. The special episode was hosted by television presenter Jonathan Ruiz.

Contestants 

Ages, names, and cities stated are at time of filming.

Contestant progress

Lip syncs
Legend:

Notes:

Guest judges 
Listed in chronological order:

Jon Kortajarena, model and actor
, former showgirl and actress
Carlos Areces, actor and singer
Bad Gyal, singer and songwriter
Alaska, singer
, comedian
Envy Peru, drag queen, winner of the first season of Drag Race Holland

Special guests
Guests who appeared in episodes, but did not judge on the main stage.

Episode 4
, performer and activist
, drag queen

Episode 6
Brays Efe, actor

Episode 8
Alexis Mateo, contestant on season three of RuPaul's Drag Race and season one and season five of RuPaul's Drag Race All Stars

Episode 9
Valentina, drag queen, contestant and Miss Congeniality on the ninth season of RuPaul's Drag Race, and contestant on the fourth season of All Stars
Carmelo Segura, choreographer

Episodes

References

2021 in LGBT history
2021 Spanish television seasons
Drag Race España seasons